Tidal is the debut studio album by American singer-songwriter Fiona Apple, released on July 23, 1996 by The WORK Group. Tidal produced six singles: "Shadowboxer", "Slow Like Honey", "Sleep to Dream", "The First Taste", "Criminal" and "Never Is a Promise". "Criminal", the album's most popular single, won a Grammy Award for Best Female Rock Vocal Performance in 1998. In 2017, Tidal got its first vinyl run as a "Vinyl Me Please" exclusive "Record of the Month".

Background and reception

"When I did Tidal," Apple said in 2000, "it was more for the sake of proving myself; telling people from my past something. And to also try to get friends for the future."

Tidal was received well by critics, with Jenny Eliscu of Rolling Stone and Richard Harrington of The Washington Post describing it as a mature effort comparable to the work of singer/songwriters Alanis Morissette and Tori Amos. In 2010, Rolling Stone ranked the album at number 83 among the 100 greatest albums of the 1990s. The following year, Slant Magazine placed it at number 74. The album is featured in the book 1001 Albums You Must Hear Before You Die. In 2022, Rolling Stone ranked the album at number 25 on its list of "100 Best Debut Albums of All Time", claiming that it was "just the beginning — and Apple has kept topping herself artistically ever since."

As of July 2016, the album has sold 2.9 million copies in United States.

Track listing

Personnel
Musicians

Fiona Apple –  vocals (all tracks), piano (1–3, 5–9), Optigan (2)
Jon Brion – guitar (1–2, 6, 10), vibraphone (1–3, 5–6, 9–10), tack piano (1, 3, 6, 9), harp (8, 10), dulcitone (2), marimba (2, 6), Chamberlin (4, 10), Optigan (8)
George Black – drum programming (6)
Matt Chamberlain – drums (1–2, 4, 6, 8–10), percussion (1, 6, 10)
Larry Corbett – cello (7)
Danny Frankel – drums (3, 5), percussion (6)
Rob Laufer – guitar (4)
Sara Lee – bass guitar (6, 9)
Greg Leisz – pedal steel guitar (2, 8)
Amber Maggart – harmony vocals (9)
Ralph Morrison – first violin (7)
Claudia Parducci – second violin (7)
Greg Richling – bass guitar (2–3, 5)
Dan Rothchild – bass (1, 4, 8, 10)
Patrick Warren – piano (1, 4), Chamberlin (1–3, 5–6, 8–10)
Evan Wilson – viola (7)
Van Dyke Parks – string arrangement (7)

Production

Andrew Slater – production
Mark Endert – recording, mixing
Claude "Swifty" Achille – additional engineering
Brian Scheuble – additional engineering
Jim Wirt – additional engineering
Niko Bolas – additional engineering
Troy Gonzalez – assistant engineering
Al Sanderson – assistant engineering
Tom Banghart – mixing assistance
Ted Jensen – mastering
Valerie Pack – production coordination
Nathaniel Goldberg – photography
Fred Woodward – art direction

Charts

Weekly charts

Year-end charts

Singles

Certifications and sales

References

External links

[ Billboard chart history]
Loyal fans helped free Fiona Apple's CD. Associated Press.

Fiona Apple albums
1996 debut albums
Columbia Records albums
Epic Records albums
Jazz albums by American artists